Pelephone (lit. "wonder phone") is a mobile network operator in Israel, and also the first company to offer mobile telephony services in Israel. Due to this, the brand-name "Pelephone" became the genericized trademark for mobile phones in Israel, regardless of service provider. The company is a subsidiary of the Israeli telecommunications conglomerate Bezeq, which is also the principal provider of terrestrial telephone service in the country. As of June 2016 Pelephone had 2.26 million wireless subscribers.

History

Pelephone was founded as a company in 1985 as a joint venture between Motorola and Tadiran, after Motorola was awarded the contract to build Israel's first mobile phone network in November 1983. Pelephone began operations of its mobile phone network in March 1986. Pelephone's first television commercial featured Israeli actor Hanan Goldblatt using his car phone to buy and sell shares via a stockbroker while driving at the same time.

In 1994, Bezeq acquired 50% ownership of Pelephone, and in 2004 acquired full ownership of the company from its co-owner Motorola.

In December 2011 Pelephone became the host network of "Rami Levy Communications", the first MVNO to begin operating in Israel. As of 2012, Pelephone states that it has 4,500 employees, although the workers' union says that there are just 3,800.

YouPhone (Alon Cellular) was a member of the Pelephone network as a virtual MVNO operator. It was established as a subsidiary of Alon Blue Square Israel, but since 2015 it has been owned completely by Pelephone and also merged its operations with Pelephone.

Network

The Pelephone network started as AMPS/NAMPS in the 850 MHz band. In the mid-to-late 1990s it converted to IS-95 CDMA and later added CDMA2000/EV-DO capabilities as well.

A UMTS network in the 850/2100 MHz bands was launched in early 2009 and in March of that year, Pelephone stopped selling cellphones that use the CDMA system. In mid-2010, the UMTS network was upgraded to HSPA+. In 2014 the company launched an LTE network in the 1800 MHz band.

In April 2017, Pelephone announced plans to shut down their CDMA network over the summer, and did so on June 28, 2017.

Operations and services

Pelephone lost its monopoly status in 1994, when Cellcom was founded, breaking Pelephone's monopoly as a mobile network operator, and in 1999, a third competitor, Partner (formerly known as Orange) was established.

The prefix (area code) for Pelephone customers is 050, although customers who requested to keep their old number from a different cellular company may have a different area code, as required by law.

Hii mobile

On April 11, 2016, Pelephone launched a new mobile brand "Hii-Mobile", in cooperation with Hunnam (owned by Yaakov Kedmi). This brand appeals particularly to young people, soldiers and students with attractive offers and packages for this target audience.

Pmobile
Pelephone and the Bug Multisystem retail chain launched the cellphone brand "Pmobile" in May 2016. The brand offers Pelephone network services at prices significantly lower than normal.

Criticism

Involvement in Israeli settlements

On 12 February 2020, the United Nations published a database of companies doing business related in the West Bank, including East Jerusalem, as well as in the occupied Golan Heights. Pelephone was listed on the database on account of its activities in Israeli settlements in these occupied territories, which are considered illegal under international law.

See also 
Bezeq
Walla!
Spacecom
List of mobile network operators of Israel

References

Mobile phone companies of Israel
Israeli brands
1986 establishments in Israel